The Canon T70 was a 35mm FD-mount single-lens reflex camera introduced in April 1984 as the second in Canon's T series.  The T70 started with the concepts explored in 1983's T50, took them further, and applied them to a more sophisticated camera.  While the Program AE-only T50 was intended as a beginner's camera, the T70 gave the photographer a lot more control over the camera's operation while keeping the T-series philosophy of simplicity in control and operation intact.

Camera features

Power 
All film transport on the T70 was powered—loading, advance and rewind. The continuous shooting rate, at 0.7 frames per second, was slower than rival motor drives, but the drive was nonetheless faster than most people could manually wind. To load the camera, the photographer simply had to pull the film leader out to an orange mark and close the back—the camera did the rest, loading the leader onto the spool, and advancing to the first frame automatically. All powered camera functions drew on two AA batteries in the grip. A built-in lithium battery (BR-1225 or CR-1220) was used to store user settings such as current exposure count and ISO setting; the batteries lasted for about five years, and had to be replaced by a technician, since replacing them required partial dismantling of the camera body and desoldering the battery from a flexible circuit board. The camera will still operate without issue if the battery has failed.

Controls 

The T70 used an LCD mounted on the top of the right-hand side of the camera as a major component of its user interface.  Two buttons above the display labeled 'UP' and 'DOWN' adjusted the selected parameter and the results were shown on the LCD.  Buttons on the left-hand top of the camera selected the parameter to be modified.

Metering 

The T70 included two different through-the-lens metering methods; both used a silicon photocell housed above the viewfinder eyepiece. Center-weighted average metering was the standard metering method, averaging over the whole frame with a slight preference towards the center of the frame, where the main subject is most likely to be.  With strongly backlit scenes, or ones where the subject is spotlit against a dark background, center-weighted averaging produces underexposure or overexposure, respectively.  For such situations, the T70 also supported selective area metering, which metered only the center 11% of the frame.  The metering mode was selected by a sliding switch on the top left-hand side of the camera (from the photographer's perspective).  This switch also selected self-timer mode and had a Lock position.

Exposure modes 
The T70 supported eight different exposure modes.  These were:

 Program AE (autoexposure). In this standard mode, the camera judges the shutter speed and aperture for average photographic scenes.
 Wide Program AE. Here, the camera is biased towards choosing narrow apertures for greater depth of field, most often useful with wide-angle lenses.
 Tele Program AE. Here, the camera is biased towards choosing wider apertures for narrow depth of field and fast shutter speeds, most useful with telephoto lenses.
 Shutter-priority AE. Here, the user selects the shutter speed and the camera chooses the correct aperture.
 Programmed flash AE. This is designed to work with the Speedlite 277T dedicated flash unit.
 Electronic flash AE. For flash exposures with non-dedicated flash units.
 Manual. Here, the photographer chooses both aperture and shutter speed.
 Stopped-down AE. For use with older FL-mount lenses that do not support open-aperture metering. Also for use with macro photography attachments such as extension tubes and bellows, and for using non-Canon lenses with an adaptor. Cannot be selected with an FD lens attached.

Data back 

A dedicated Command Back 70 supported date and data imprinting as well as time exposures, to take a photograph at a programmed time, and to take time-lapse photos at programmed intervals.  The shutter of the T70 was not battery dependent during bulb exposures, and was one reason why the command back could support timed exposures of several hours duration.

Reception 

When it was introduced, the Canon T70 was considered technologically advanced compared to other SLR cameras. Reviewing the camera in Popular Science, Everett Ortner said that the T70 "could be...too good for amateurs. It is certainly far removed from those other technological wonders designed for amateurs". He praised the high degree of control, coupled with automation, that the T70 allows photographers to use, reducing "the role of the camera from that of master to servant."

Gallery

References

External links 

 Canon T70. From Canon's online Camera Museum.
 Photography in Malaysia (2000). Canon T70 Camera.  Retrieved 20 October 2005.

T70